George Onslow, 1st Earl of Onslow PC (13 September 1731 – 17 May 1814), known as Lord Onslow from 1776 until 1801, was a British peer and politician.

Background
He was the only son of Arthur Onslow, having no brothers but one sister, who died in 1751. Following in the footsteps of his father, he was admitted to the Middle Temple on 14 November 1739, but was not Called to the Bar.

Career
Onslow sat as Member of Parliament for Rye from 1754 to 1761 and for Surrey from 1761 to 1774.

On 3 March 1759 he was commissioned as Lieutenant-Colonel of the Surrey Militia which his kinsman Richard Onslow, 3rd Baron Onslow, had raised and briefly commanded as Lord Lieutenant of Surrey. On 3 November that year, the regiment was divided into two battalions and George Onslow was promoted to Colonel and given command of the 2nd or Western Battalion, with the writer Francis Grose as his adjutant. The militia was disembodied in December 1762 at the end of the Seven Years' War and the two Surrey battalions amalgamated on 26 February 1763, when Onslow was made colonel of the combined regiment. He resigned the command on 20 October 1765 after he became a government minister. Later, when he was himself Lord Lieutenant of Surrey, his eldest son commanded the 2nd Royal Surrey Militia.

From 1765 to 1777, he was a junior Lord of the Treasury. He then became successively Comptroller of the Household and Treasurer of the Household. On 20 May 1776, he was created Baron Cranley, of Imber Court in the County of Surrey. On 8 October 1776, he also succeeded his second cousin Richard Onslow, 3rd Baron Onslow, as Baron Onslow. He was further honoured on 17 June 1801 when he was created Viscount Cranley, of Cranley in the County of Surrey, and Earl of Onslow, of Onslow in the County of Shropshire.

Family
Lord Onslow married Henrietta Shelley (d. May 1802), daughter of Sir John Shelley, 4th Baronet and his second wife Margaret Pelham, on 26 June 1753. They had four sons and one daughter:

Thomas Onslow, 2nd Earl of Onslow (15 March 1754 – 22 February 1827)
John Onslow (21 November 1755 – 4 February 1757)
Henry Onslow (9 February 1757 – 25 July 1757)
Edward Onslow (9 April 1758 – 18 October 1829), married on 6 March 1783 Marie Rosalie de Bourdeille and had issue.
Henrietta Onslow (b. 18 March 1760, died in infancy)

In 1778, Lord Onslow sold Imber Court in Thames Ditton, and a large estate including farms and gardens, and the Imber Court Copper Mills.

The Earl died on 17 May 1814 aged 82 and was succeeded by his eldest son.

Notes

References

 Burke's Peerage, Baronetage and Knightage, 100th Edn, London, 1953.
 Capt John Davis, Historical Records of the Second Royal Surrey or Eleventh Regiment of Militia, London: Marcus Ward, 1877.

External links

 Queen's Royal Surrey Regiment

1731 births
1814 deaths
British MPs 1754–1761
British MPs 1761–1768
British MPs 1768–1774
1
Lord-Lieutenants of Surrey
Surrey Militia officers
Members of the Parliament of Great Britain for English constituencies
Members of the Privy Council of Great Britain
People from Thames Ditton
Treasurers of the Household
Peers of Great Britain created by George III